Joana Resende  (born 23 March 2001) is a Portuguese handball player for Paris 92 and the Portuguese national team.

She represented Portugal in the 2018 Women's Junior World Handball Championship, placing 18th and in the 2019 Women's U-19 European Handball Championship, placing 14th. She was also top scorer for Portugal and the overall topscorer at the 2019 Women's U-19 European Handball Championship, with 55 goals.

She made international debut on the Portuguese national team on 25 November 2018, against Greece.

She is the daughter of former Portuguese top handball player, Carlos Resende.

Individual awards  
 Topscorer of the Junior European Championship: 2019

References

External links

2001 births
Living people
Portuguese female handball players
Sportspeople from Porto